Mossville is a small, predominantly African American unincorporated community on the outskirts of Lake Charles in Calcasieu Parish, Louisiana, United States. It is part of the Lake Charles Metropolitan Statistical Area and is sandwiched between Sulphur to the west and Westlake to the east. With the Sasol expansion project almost all of the homes north of Old Spanish Trail have now been either moved to other locations or torn down and the land completely deforested.

The community is featured in the 2002 documentary film Blue Vinyl, which focuses on the health effects of nearby polyvinyl chloride factories on community members. The film features footage of the Louisiana Bucket Brigade collecting air samples to determine the toxicity of the community's air. Some of its last residents were documented in the 2019 film Mossville, When Great Trees Fall which played at festivals around the world and broadcast nationally on PBS.

History 
Mossville was founded by Jack Moss, an ex-slave, beginning in 1790. This was more than fifty years before the creation of Imperial Calcasieu Parish. Over the years the hamlet grew to more than 600 residents but was never incorporated. The main roads are the Old Spanish Trail (East Burton Street), Prater Road, and extends west to the Sulphur city limits and Evergreen Road.

The town was settled by former enslaved Africans who were granted the land through a "fee-simple title acquired by squatters rights." In this manner, anyone who agreed to improve the property while residing for a specified number of years could attain ownership.

After the Civil War, these individuals mostly from nearby farms, settled on the land and began growing crops and raising cattle. Originally known as Shoats Prairie, Mossville has a current population of 8,000 inhabitants.

The area remained rural until the early 1900s, when the Locke-Moore Company built a sawmill. Lumbering became the major industry and was later joined by sugar refinement.

The greatest period of growth occurred in the 1940s and 1950s, when petrochemical and industrial plants moved into the area. Today, these plants remain the primary source of employment for Mossville residents.

The massive Sasol chemical plant project is physically changing the Mossville landscape and geography. The town has almost no resemblance to what it looked liked before the chemical plant project.

Sasol 
Vista Chemical Company purchased Conoco Chemical Company in July 1984. In March 1996, Vista Chemical Company became Condea Vista Company. Sasol bought Condea Vista in 2000. Sasol was originally created during the apartheid-era South Africa as a synthetic oil company that helped the apartheid South African government avoid the late 1960s international oil embargo.  Sasol has since grown into a multinational petrochemical company that has expanded well beyond its original mission of producing synthetic fuels.

The Sasol project that includes the ethane cracker complex, over 3 square miles with an estimated at $8.1 billion cost, and is named the Lake Charles Chemical Projects. This replaces the previously named Ethane Cracker Projects and Lake Charles Cracker Projects.

All of the streets north of Old Spanish Trail within the Mossville community has been absorbed into Sasol by the property being bought through the voluntary land purchase program and closed to the public. These streets include VCM Plant road, Center street, 1st through 8th avenue, Michigan avenue, Lincoln avenue, Laurel avenue, and Rigmaiden avenue. Evergreen street near the Sulphur city limits is also included in the closures. The entire area has been deforested with major ongoing construction.

History preservation 
Sasol, through a $275,000 donation, funded the Mossville History Project with the Imperial Calcasieu Museum. The goal is to "capture, record, preserve and make available Mossville’s written and oral history."

Controversy 
There has been an ongoing controversy concerning Mossville residents and area pollution. In 1993 a pipeline (built in 1947) transferring ethylene dichloride was found to be leaking into the Calcasieu estuary. The company estimated that 1.6 million pounds had leaked but other sources gave estimates of from 19 to 47 million pounds. Citizens claimed that ethylene dichloride had leaked into the water system and a lawsuit was settled for $47 million.

The buyout 
In August 2013 Sasol opened an office on Old Spanish Trail to facilitate the Voluntary Property Purchase Program and extended the early signup part until November. The program covers 883 lots (an area around 620 acres) in Mossville and the Brentwood subdivision that is on the south side of Old Spanish Trail. Property owners that occupy their homes are offered $100,000 minimum and 60% of the appraised value, based on a complicated appraisal system, $75,000 for Rental property owners, and $5,000 for unimproved property. All property owners get a $500 professional advice allowance and those that qualify early get an additional $1,000. The firm Advocates for Environmental Human Rights in New Orleans is representing residents that have not agreed to the buyout seeking to address problems including disability assistance, avoiding financial hardship, and that the program offer is non-negotiable. 62 residents of Mossville and 2 residents of Brentwood are not expected to leave. Heirship rights must also be considered as there could be as many as 80 heirs.

See also 
 Mossville Environmental Action Now

References

External links 
Bill Walsh: Is There A Human Right To A Healthy Environment? Communities Near Louisiana Vinyl Plants File Historic Complaint With Inter-American Commission on Human Rights. Healthy Building Network, 2005-3-10
Adrianne Appel: Tiny Town Demands Justice in Dioxin Poisoning. Common Dreams, 2007-7-25
US plants accused of 'environmental racism' . Al Jazeera English, 2014-4-11

Unincorporated communities in Calcasieu Parish, Louisiana
Unincorporated communities in Louisiana
Unincorporated communities in Lake Charles metropolitan area
Populated places established by African Americans